Frank Anthony Buckiewicz (April 14, 1930 – September 5, 2017) was an American football player and coach. He served as the head football coach at Pacific University in Forest Grove, Oregon from 1965 to 1980.

Born in Perth Amboy, New Jersey, Buckiewicz graduated from Perth Amboy High School in 1947. When, Frank was the coach at Grant HS in Portland, he had a HS record of 88-23-2.

References

1930 births
2017 deaths
Pacific Boxers football coaches
Pacific Boxers football players
High school football coaches in Oregon
Perth Amboy High School alumni
Sportspeople from Perth Amboy, New Jersey
Players of American football from New Jersey